Ghazanfar is a masculine given name.

Given name
 Gazanfar Akbarov (1917–1944), Azerbaijani Red Army officer
 Gazanfar Khaligov (1898-1981), Azerbaijani painter
 Gazanfar Musabekov (1888–1938), Azerbaijani Bolshevik revolutionary and Soviet statesman
 Gazanfer Bilge (1924–2008), Turkish sports wrestler
 Gazanfer Özcan (1931–2009), Turkish actor
 Ghazanfar Abbas Cheena (born 1962), Pakistani politician
 Ghazanfar Abbas Shah, Pakistani colonel
 Ghazanfar Ali (born 1978), Pakistani hockey player
 Ghazanfar Ali Khan (1895–1963), Pakistani diplomat
 Ghazanfar Roknabadi, Iranian diplomat
 Mir Ghazanfar Ali Khan (born 1945), Gilgit-Baltistani politician
 Nawabzada Gazanfar Ali Gul, Pakistani politician
 Sardar Ghaznafar Ali Khan, Punjabi politician

Surname
 Allah Mohammad Ghazanfar (born 2007), Afghan cricketer
 Husn Banu Ghazanfar (born 1957), Afghan politician
 Mohammad Ghazanfar (born 1994), Hong Kongese cricketer

See also
 Ghaznafar, former name of Aragats, Aparan, a village in Armenia
 Ghazanfarabad, village in West Azerbaijan
 Ghazanfari, village in Khaf County, Iran
 Ghazanfari Khan Ahmad-e Sofla, village in Basht District, Iran
 Ghazanfarkhani, village in Boyer-Ahmad County, Iran